Patebari Gaon is a village located in Nalbari district of Assam, India. Its population is almost 1 lakh. Most of the people are farmers and servicemen. All villagers are Hindu by religion, and they celebrate all the festivals. The main festival of the village is Kali Puja.

Villages in Nalbari district